The Northern Territory Electoral Commission (NTEC) is an independent government  agency of the Government of the Northern Territory with responsibility for the conduct of elections for the unicameral NT Legislative Assembly, referendums and local government (Council) elections. It also determines electoral boundaries for the NT and provides electoral advice and services to government and on-government agencies. It is also responsible for electoral research, registration of political parties and tracking of their finances, and promoting public awareness of elections. The NTEC was established on 15 March 2004, by the Electoral Act 2004.

Structure and Staffing
The NT Electoral Commission consists of a small number of full-time staff, including the Electoral Commissioner, Iain Loganathan. The commission hires casual workers around election times, when work levels grow.

See also

 Northern Territory Legislative Assembly
 Electoral divisions of the Northern Territory
 Electoral systems of the Australian states and territories
 Parliaments of the Australian states and territories

References

External links
 

Elections in the Northern Territory
Electoral commissions in Australia
Government agencies of the Northern Territory